Louis Woodard "Lou" Jones (January 15, 1932 – February 3, 2006) was an American athlete. He won a gold medal in the 4x400 m relay at the 1956 Summer Olympics.

Born in New Rochelle, New York, Jones graduated from Manhattan College in 1954. He won the 400 m at the 1955 Pan-American Games, where he set a new world record of 45.4. He was also a member of the gold medal-winning American 4 × 400 m relay team.

Just four months before the Melbourne Olympics, Jones broke his own 400 m world record, clocking 45.2 at the Los Angeles Memorial Coliseum in the US Olympic Trials, thus becoming a main favorite at this event in Melbourne. But in the Olympic 400 m final, Jones was off form, and managed to finish only in a disappointing fifth place, 1.50 seconds behind teammate Charles Jenkins. A few days later, Jones partly compensated for his disappointment, running the second leg in the gold medal-winning American 4 × 400 m relay team.

References
 
 
 Lou Jones 1932-2006 Teacher, coach, Olympic athlete

1932 births
2006 deaths
American male sprinters
Sportspeople from New Rochelle, New York
Track and field athletes from New York (state)
Athletes (track and field) at the 1955 Pan American Games
Athletes (track and field) at the 1956 Summer Olympics
Olympic gold medalists for the United States in track and field
World record setters in athletics (track and field)
Manhattan College alumni
Medalists at the 1956 Summer Olympics
Pan American Games gold medalists for the United States
Pan American Games medalists in athletics (track and field)
Medalists at the 1955 Pan American Games
New Rochelle High School alumni